Typhoon Lan, known in the Philippines as Typhoon Paolo, was the third-most intense tropical cyclone worldwide in 2017. A very large storm, Lan was the twenty-first tropical storm and ninth typhoon of the annual typhoon season. It originated from a tropical disturbance that the United States Naval Research Laboratory had begun tracking near Chuuk on October 11. Slowly consolidating, it developed into a tropical storm on October 15, and intensified into a typhoon on October 17. It expanded in size and turned northward on October 18, although the typhoon struggled to intensify for two days. On October 20, Lan grew into a very large typhoon and rapidly intensified, due to favorable conditions, with a large well-defined eye, reaching peak intensity as a "super typhoon" with 1-minute sustained winds of  – a high-end Category 4-equivalent storm – late on the same day. Afterward, encroaching dry air and shear caused the cyclone to begin weakening and turn extratropical, before it struck Japan on October 23 as a weaker typhoon. Later that day, it became fully extratropical before it was absorbed by a larger storm shortly afterward.

Lan caused significant impacts in Japan, with over 380,000 evacuations occurring in Japan, and the cancellations of several domestic flights. In total, approximately 17 deaths were attributed to the typhoon, mainly due to flooding from its rainbands. Damage totals were estimated to have been at least US$2 billion (2017 USD), making it one of the costliest typhoons to have struck Japan.

Meteorological history

The United States Naval Research Laboratory (NRL) initially mentioned a tropical disturbance over Chuuk on October 11. After the slow consolidation, the Joint Typhoon Warning Center (JTWC) issued a Tropical Cyclone Formation Alert to the elongated system early on October 14, shortly after the Japan Meteorological Agency (JMA) started to monitor it as a low-pressure area. The agency upgraded it to a tropical depression almost one day later and began to issue tropical cyclone warnings since 06:00 UTC on October 15. In the afternoon, the JTWC also upgraded it to a tropical depression assigning the designation 25W, which formative but shallow convective bands had become more organized, and symmetrically wrapped into a defined low-level circulation center. Early on October 16, the JTWC upgraded Lan to a tropical storm too, based on T-number 2.5 of the Dvorak technique, shortly before it entered the Philippine Area of Responsibility and received the name Paolo from PAGASA.

In an area of low to moderate low vertical wind shear, convection over Lan's center was occasionally displaced, but strong poleward outflow enhanced by a tropical upper tropospheric trough (TUTT) as well as sea surface temperature (SST) over 30ºC with high ocean heat content (OHC) contributed to the intensification, resulting in being upgraded to a severe tropical storm by the JMA at around 00:00 UTC on October 17. Soon, the westward system became quasi-stationary due to a weakening subtropical ridge to the north. When Lan developed into the ninth typhoon of 2017 at around 18:00 UTC, it had turned slowly northward under the steering influence of a building steering ridge to the southeast and east. Early on the next day, the JTWC also upgraded it to a typhoon. although it later became partially exposed for a half of day. Despite favorable conditions, Lan had struggled to intensify for two days, even while growing larger in diameter.

Early on October 21, when Lan accelerated north-northeastward along the western periphery of the deep layered subtropical ridge, the JTWC reported that its one-minute maximum sustained winds reached , a high-end category 4 of the Saffir–Simpson scale, ranging from T6.5 to T7.0 of the Dvorak technique. For increasing vertical wind shear, Lan began to weaken and undergo the extratropical transition early on October 22 with significant erosion of its eyewall, after maintaining the super typhoon status as well as peak intensity for over one day. Despite excellent poleward outflow tapping into the mid-latitude westerlies over Japan, the satellite imageries revealed cold-air stratocumulus streaming southward over the western semi-circle of the typhoon, which was associated with advection of cooler, drier air. As the result, the once large eye was quickly filled, and Lan was exhibiting frontal characteristics.

Three hours later, Lan weakened to a severe tropical storm. Lan entered the Pacific Ocean shortly before 09:00 JST (00:00 UTC) and continued accelerating northeastward within the westerlies, displaying a well-defined frontal structure with an exposed, broad center and rapidly decaying deep convection sheared to the northeast. The JMA reported that Lan had become extratropical at 06:00 UTC, although the JTWC issued a final warning three hours before and even declared an extratropical cyclone about 12 hours earlier. A new extratropical low absorbed the former typhoon late on the same day and explosively intensified into a  system east of the Kamchatka Peninsula, on October 24.

Preparations and impact

Ahead of the storm, approximately 381,000 people were evacuated from their homes. Several flights were also cancelled due to the typhoon's impending arrival, and some of Japan's trains were suspended.

In total, 17 people were killed in Mainland Japan and the agricultural loss were about JP¥62.19 billion (US$547.9 million). Total economic losses were counted to be US$2 billion. In the Osaka Prefecture, a train was forced to brake due to part of the railroad having caved in. The typhoon's remnant moisture boosted the intensity of another extratropical cyclone, which later opened up an atmospheric river, contributing to heavy flooding in Alaska from October 24 to 28.

See also

Weather of 2017
Tropical cyclones in 2017
Typhoon Tip – The largest typhoon recorded, which was also the most intense tropical cyclone on record
Typhoon Noru (2017)
Typhoon Wipha (2013)
Typhoon Chaba (2010)
Typhoon Phanfone (2014) 
Typhoon Jebi (2018)—another intense tropical cyclone to hit Japan less than a year later in September 2018.

References

External links

JMA General Information of Typhoon Lan (1721) from Digital Typhoon
JMA Best Track Data of Typhoon Lan (1721) 
25W.LAN from the U.S. Naval Research Laboratory

2017 Pacific typhoon season
October 2017 events in Japan
Typhoons in Japan
Lan